Donald "Doc" William Dann, OAM (12 February 1949 – 31 July 2005) was an Australian Paralympic athlete and table tennis player. He was born in the Tasmanian town of Wynyard. He lost a leg to a land mine in the Vietnam War, where he served in the 3rd Cavalry Regiment from 3 December 1968 to 2 June 1969. He competed in athletics and table tennis at the 1980 Arnhem Paralympics and won a silver medal in the Men's Javelin A4 event at the 1984 New York/Stoke Mandeville Paralympics.

He founded the Tasmanian Amputee Sporting Association, was involved with several charity military and civilian organisations, and was involved with local football. He was awarded life membership of the Burnie sub-branch of the Returned and Services League of Australia in 2002, along with a Medal of the Order of Australia in 2004, due to his strong involvement in the organisation. He died on 31 July 2005, aged 56, in Burnie.

References

External links
Donald Dan – Athletics Australia Results

Paralympic athletes of Australia
Paralympic table tennis players of Australia
Athletes (track and field) at the 1980 Summer Paralympics
Table tennis players at the 1980 Summer Paralympics
Athletes (track and field) at the 1984 Summer Paralympics
Medalists at the 1984 Summer Paralympics
Amputee category Paralympic competitors
Australian amputees
Sportsmen from Tasmania
Recipients of the Medal of the Order of Australia
Australian military personnel of the Vietnam War
Paralympic silver medalists for Australia
Paralympic medalists in athletics (track and field)
1949 births
2005 deaths
Australian male javelin throwers
Javelin throwers with limb difference
Paralympic javelin throwers